Améyo Adja (born July 1956) is a Togolese politician and a member of the Pan-African Parliament from Togo.

Adja was born in Lomé. She was elected to the National Assembly of Togo in the October 2002 parliamentary election as a candidate of the Rally for the Strengthening of Democracy and Development (RSDD) from the Second Constituency of Lomé, and she became President of the Opposition Parliamentary Group. She was elected to the ECOWAS Parliament by the National Assembly on November 2, 2005, receiving 59 votes from the 68 deputies present.

She was also elected to the Pan-African Parliament, becoming one of Togo's five members when it began meeting in March 2004.

References

1956 births
Living people
Members of the Pan-African Parliament from Togo
Rally for the Support of Democracy and Development politicians
21st-century Togolese women politicians
21st-century Togolese politicians
People from Lomé
Women members of the Pan-African Parliament